Vela 1A (or Vela 1) was a military satellite developed to detect nuclear detonations to monitor compliance with the 1963 Partial Test Ban Treaty by the Soviet Union.

Launch
Vela 1A was launched on October 17, 1963 from the Cape Canaveral Air Force Station, Florida, by an Atlas-Agena launch vehicle. Vela 1A was launched along with Vela 1B and with ERS 12.

Mission
Vela 1A was a spin-stabilized 124-kg satellite comprising the first launch in a series of six Vela launches. Together with its twin Vela 1B, their objectives were to monitor nuclear weapons explosions in space and to study x-rays, gamma-rays, neutrons, and charged particles as the satellites passed through interplanetary space, the bow shock, the magnetosheath, and the magnetotail.

See also 
 Vela (satellite)

References 

1963 in spaceflight
Military space program of the United States